Peter Machinist is an American historian, currently the Hancock Professor Emeritus of Hebrew and other Oriental Languages at Harvard University.

References

Year of birth missing (living people)
Living people
Harvard University faculty
21st-century American historians
21st-century American male writers
Harvard University alumni
Yale University alumni
American male non-fiction writers